The fifth USS Relief was a lightship that served in the United States Navy from 1918 to 1919.

Relief was built in 1904 as a light vessel for the United States Lighthouse Service, a part of the United States Department of the Treasury. She was employed as one of ten reserve vessels designated "relief", assuming the name of the station lightship she replaced when on station.

This vessel was acquired by the U.S. Navy on 29 August 1918 for World War I service and assigned to the 6th Naval District for service as a lightship.

She was returned to the U.S. Lighthouse Service on 30 August 1919, remaining on its registers through the 1920s.

The ship was featured by Huell Howser in California's Gold Episode 210.

References

 

Ships of the United States Lighthouse Service
Ships built in the United States
1904 ships
Lightships of the United States Navy
World War I auxiliary ships of the United States